Highway 150 (AR 150, Ark. 150, and Hwy. 150) is a  east–west state highway in Mississippi County, Arkansas. The route runs from Highway 181 north of Gosnell east across US Route 61 (US 61) and Interstate 55 (I-55) to Highway 137 at Huffman.

Route description
Highway 150 begins at Highway 181 north of Gosnell and the Arkansas International Airport. The highway has a spur route that serves as a shortcut to travelers looking for US 61 southbound and later intersects and begins a concurrency near Yarbro. After the concurrency ends, Highway 150 intersects Interstate 55 at exit 71. East of this junction the route meets Highway 321 before terminating at Highway 137 at Huffman.

Major intersections
Mile markers reset at concurrencies.

|-
| align=center colspan=4 |  concurrency north, 
|-

Yarbro spur

Highway 150 Spur (AR 150S, Ark. 150S, and Hwy. 150S) is a north–south state highway spur route at Yarbro. The route of  serves to connect travelers on Highway 150 to US 61 heading south.

Major intersections

References

150
Transportation in Mississippi County, Arkansas